Barilko or Barylko (Ukrainian: Барілко) is a gender-neutral Ukrainian surname that may refer to:

Bill Barilko (1927–1951), Canadian ice hockey player
Mieczysław Baryłko (1923–2002), Polish painter
Serhiy Barylko (born 1987), Ukrainian football midfielder
Volodymyr Barilko (born 1994), Ukrainian football striker, brother of Serhiy
Barilko (horse), 2006 winner of the Colin Stakes

See also
 

Ukrainian-language surnames